Shabakhusekul (also Romanized as Shabakhsekūl; also known as Shabakhsegūl) is a village in Goli Jan Rural District, in the Central District of Tonekabon County, Mazandaran Province, Iran. At the 2006 census, its population was 560, in 167 families.

References 

Populated places in Tonekabon County